is a former Japanese football player.

Club career
Tanaka was born in Tokyo on April 17, 1979. After playing on a youth team, he joined J1 League club Verdy Kawasaki in 1998. In the same year, he also entered Kokushikan University. In July 1999, he moved to Yokohama FC. In 2000, he joined the Kokushikan University team. After graduating from the university in 2002, he played for S.League club Home United (2002), Tanjong Pagar United (2003). Thai League 1 club Osotspa (2003–04) and New Zealand Football Championship club Waitakere United (2004–05).

National team career
In August 1995, Tanaka was selected for the Japan U-17 national team for 1995 U-17 World Championship. He played 2 matches in the tournament.

References

External links

1979 births
Living people
Kokushikan University alumni
Association football people from Tokyo
Japanese footballers
Japan youth international footballers
J1 League players
Japan Football League players
Tokyo Verdy players
Yokohama FC players
Association football forwards